Aralia stipulata is a plant species native to China.

References 

stipulata
Flora of China
Taxa named by Adrien René Franchet